Christopher Marte (born April 26, 1989) is an American politician who is a member of the New York City Council for the 1st district, elected in November 2021.

His district includes all or parts of Battery Park City, Chinatown, Civic Center, East Village, Ellis Island, Financial District, Governors Island, Greenwich Village, Liberty Island, Little Italy, Lower East Side, NoHo, Nolita, SoHo, Tribeca, and the West Village.

Early life and education 
Marte was born and raised on the Lower East Side of Manhattan. He attended St. Agnes Boys High School and earned a Bachelor of Arts degree in international economics and politics from LIU Global.

Career 
After graduating from college, Marte worked in finance for IBM. He then joined Arena, a Democratic-affiliated political action committee that trains candidates and campaign staffers. He later co-founded Neighbors United Below Canal, a non-profit organization.

New York City Council
Marte ran for City Council in 2017, losing narrowly to incumbent Margaret Chin. He ran again in the 2021 Council elections, which were the first New York City elections to use ranked-choice voting. In the Democratic primary, Marte won 34.9% of the votes in the first round of voting and 60.5% of the votes in the final round. Marte won 72.1% of the vote in the general election.

Marte's campaign was bolstered by anger within the district at Chin's ties to real-estate developers, as well as by name recognition he had gained while attempting to primary Chin in the previous council election. Marte's campaign was also unique in redefining the common ties that the different parts of District 1 have, in the Lower East Side, TriBeCa, Chinatown, and SoHo. 

In 2022, Marte filed a lawsuit to prevent the construction of four tower developments in Downtown Manhattan on the basis that the dense housing construction was "environmental racism" and violated people's right "to clean air and water, and a healthful environment."

References 

American politicians of Dominican Republic descent
Living people
Long Island University alumni
New York City Council members
New York (state) Democrats
People from the Lower East Side
1989 births